The  Arizona Cardinals season was the franchise's 101st season, 80th season in the National Football League and the 12th in Arizona. The team was unable to match their previous output of 9–7, instead winning only six games. The Cardinals would fail to return to the playoffs and would not return until the 2008 season.

Offseason

Free agents

NFL Draft

Personnel

Staff

Roster

Regular season

Schedule

Standings

References 

Arizona Cardinals seasons
Arizona Cardinals
Arizona